Natasha Mhatre is a researcher in Canada at Western University whose research focuses on animal communication. Focusing on insect biomechanics, she is an Assistant Professor and NSERC Canada Research Chair in Invertebrate neurobiology.

Education
Mhatre earned her Bachelor of Science from Mumbai University in 1999, and her Master of Science and Doctorate from the Indian Institute of Science in 2002 and 2008, respectively.

Research
Mhatre's work has covered insect communication and biomechanics. Some of her research has been focused on Black Widow spiders, and she has been called a "Tree cricket Expert". Her work has had applications beyond spiders and insects to Tuvan throat singers, where she collaborated with a group to investigate how unique sounds were produced.

Mhatre holds an NSERC Canada Research Chair, and was a recipient of the Marie Curie Fellowship to support her post doctoral research.

The Otomi tree cricket Oecanthus mhatreae was named in her.

References

Living people
Indian biologists
Canada Research Chairs
1979 births
University of Mumbai alumni
Indian Institute of Science alumni